Wang Xin (born 28 August 1995) is a Chinese judoka.

She is the bronze medallist of the 2017 Judo Grand Prix Hohhot in the -52 kg category.

References

External links
 

1995 births
Living people
Chinese female judoka
Judoka at the 2018 Asian Games
Asian Games competitors for China
21st-century Chinese women